Ibrahim El Bouni (born 9 December 1992) is a Dutch-Moroccan kickboxer who currently fights for Glory. El Bouni has formerly competed for ONE Championship, SUPERKOMBAT and K-1.

He is ranked as the tenth best light heavyweight in the world by Combat Press as of September 2022, and ninth best by Beyond Kick as of October 2022. He was ranked as a top ten heavyweight by Combat Press from May 2017 to December 2017.

Kickboxing career

Early career, SUPERKOMBAT debut and Dutch circuit
He fought Denis Marjanović during FFC 13. El Bouni won the fight by a unanimous decision.

Ibrahim fought in the SUPERKOMBAT World Grand Prix, facing Dawid Kasperski in the quarter final. He lost a majority decision.

In November 2014, he scored a KO victory over Henry Brinkman.

El Bouni fought in the 2015 WFL 84 kg tournament. Despite defeating Clyde Brunswijk by decision in the semi final, he in turn lost a decision to Hicham El Gaoui in the final.

He also took part in the A1 World Combat Cup 86 kg tournament. He won decision against Xheyal Ehmedov in the quarter final, Boubaker El Bakouri in the semi final, and knocked Ertugrul Bayrak out in the first round to win the tournament.

El Bouni fought Bogdan Stoica for the first time in 2015. He won the fight by a technical knockout, as Stoica suffered a leg injury in the first round, later deemed to be a knee ligament injury.

El Bouni fought for the  Real Fighter World Heavyweight Championship against Redouan Cairo, but lost the fight by a late fifth-round knockout.

He fought the former WAKO World champion Dževad Poturak during W5 Grand Prix "Legends in Prague". Ibrahim won the fight by TKO.

K-1
El Bouni had his first fight at heavyweight against Makoto Uehara. He won the fight in the second round, with a left hook KO.

Ibrahim fought during the WFL Almere event, winning the fight in the third round by knockout.

El Bouni participated in the 2017 K-1 Heavyweight Grand Prix. After winning the first two bouts against Koichi and Roel Mannaart by first-round knockout, he faced Antonio Plazibat in the tournament finals. Plazibat won the fight by a unanimous decision.

After his loss to Plazibat, he took part in the WFL Reserve Tournament. In the semi finals he beat Bogdan Stoica by decision, and won a unanimous decision against Fred Sikking in the finals.

ONE Championship
El Bouni signed for ONE Championship in June 2018, and fought Andre Meunir in his organizational debut. El Bouni won the fight by a first-round KO.

In his second fight with the organization, El Bouni fought Tarik Khbabez. Khabez won the fight in the third round, by a TKO.

El Bouni fought Andrei Stoica during ONE Championship: Roots of Honor. Stoica won the fight by a unanimous decision, although El Bouni complained of repeated fouls after the fight, as Stoica landed an inadvertent groin shot and eye poke during the bout.

Glory
In early 2021, El Bouni signed with Glory. He notched two unanimous decision victories, against Clyde Brunswijk at Glory Rivals 1 and Badr Ferdaous at Glory Rivals 2, before being booked to face Muhammed Balli in the main event of Glory Rivals 3 on November 5, 2022. He stopped Balli with a left hook at the 2:14 minute mark of the opening round.

Championships and accomplishments
 2015 World Fighting League 84 kg Tournament Runner-up
 2015 A1 World Combat Cup 86 kg Tournament Winner
 2017 K-1 Heavyweight Grand Prix Runner-up

Kickboxing record 

|- align="center" bgcolor="#cfc"
| 2022-11-05 || Win ||align=left| Muhammed Balli || Glory Rivals 3 || Amsterdam, Netherlands || KO (Left hook) || 1 || 2:12

|-  bgcolor="#cfc"
| 2022-09-17 || Win ||align=left| Badr Ferdaous || Glory Rivals 2 ||  Alkmaar, Netherlands || Decision (Unanimous) ||  3 ||3:00
|-
|-  bgcolor="#cfc"
| 2022-06-11 ||Win ||align=left| Clyde Brunswijk || Glory Rivals 1 ||  Alkmaar, Netherlands || Decision (Unanimous) || 3 ||3:00
|-
|- bgcolor="#CCFFCC" 
| 2021-05-28 || Win||align=left| Marciano Bhungwandass || World Fighting League || Netherlands || Disqualification  || 2  ||
|-
|-  bgcolor="#FFBBBB"
| 2019-04-12 || Loss ||align=left| Andrei Stoica || ONE Championship: Roots of Honor || Manila, Philippines || Decision (Unanimous)  || 3    ||3:00
|-
|-  bgcolor="#FFBBBB"
| 2018-10-26 || Loss ||align=left| Tarik Khbabez || ONE Championship: Pursuit of Greatness || Myanmar || TKO (Referee Stoppage)  || 3  ||
|-
|-  bgcolor="#CCFFCC" 
| 2018-07-07 || Win ||align=left| Andre Meunier || ONE Championship: Battle for the Heavens || Guangzhou, China || KO  || 1  ||
|-
|-  bgcolor="#CCFFCC" 
| 2018-03-25 || Win ||align=left| Fred Sikking || WFL: Final 16 || Almere, Netherlands || Decision (Unanimous)  || 3  ||3:00
|-
|-  bgcolor="#CCFFCC" 
| 2018-03-25 || Win ||align=left| Bogdan Stoica || WFL: El Bouni vs. Stoica, Final 16 || Almere, Netherlands || Decision (Unanimous)  || 3  ||3:00
|-
|-  bgcolor="#FFBBBB"
| 2017-11-23 || Loss ||align=left| Antonio Plazibat  || K-1 World GP 2017 Heavyweight Championship Tournament, Final || Saitama, Japan || Decision (Unanimous)  || 3  ||3:00
|-
! style=background:white colspan=9 |
|- 
|-  bgcolor="#CCFFCC"
| 2017-11-23 || Win ||align=left| Roel Mannaart  || K-1 World GP 2017 Heavyweight Championship Tournament, Semi Finals || Saitama, Japan || KO  || 1  ||
|-
|-  bgcolor="#CCFFCC"
| 2017-11-23 || Win ||align=left| Koichi  || K-1 World GP 2017 Heavyweight Championship Tournament, Quarter Finals || Saitama, Japan || KO (Left Hook)  || 1  ||
|-
|-  bgcolor="#CCFFCC"
| 2017-04-23 || Win ||align=left| Fabio Kwasi  || WFL - Champion vs. Champion, Semi Finals || Almere, Netherlands || KO || 3 ||
|-
|- bgcolor="#CCFFCC"
| 2017-03-19 || Win ||align=left| Tomoslav Malencia  || Fight Time Haarlem || Haarlem, Netherlands || KO || 3  ||
|-
|- bgcolor="#CCFFCC"
| 2017-02-26 || Win ||align=left| Makoto Uehara  || K-1 World GP 2017 Lightweight Championship Tournament || Tokyo, Japan || KO (Left hook) || 2 ||
|-
|- bgcolor="#CCFFCC"
| 2016-12-23 || Win ||align=left| Davor Matarugic  || EM Legend End of Year || China || KO ||   ||
|-
|- bgcolor="#CCFFCC"
| 2016-11-19 || Win ||align=left| Xing WenXiu  || EM Legend 14 || China || KO || 1 ||
|-
|-  bgcolor="CCFFCC" 
| 2016-10-08 || Win ||align=left| Dževad Poturak || W5 Grand Prix "Legends in Prague" || Prague, The Czech Republic || TKO (strikes) || 1 ||
|-
|-  bgcolor="#CCFFCC"
| 2016-03-04 || Win ||align=left| Fred Sikking || WFL - Where Heroes Meet Legends || Hoofddorp, Netherlands || Decision || 3 ||3:00 
|-
|-  bgcolor="#FFBBB"
| 2015-12-06 ||Loss ||align=left| Redouan Cairo || Real Fighters: A Night 2 Remember  || Hilversum, Netherlands || KO || 5  ||
|-
! style=background:white colspan=9 |
|- 
|-  bgcolor="CCFFCC" 
| 2015-10-18 || Win ||align=left| Bogdan Stoica || WFL "Unfinished Business" || Hoofddorp, Netherlands || TKO (knee ligament injury) || 1  ||
|-
|- bgcolor="#CCFFCC"
| 2015-05-16 || Win ||align=left| Ertugrul Bayrak  || A1WCC -86 kg 8 Men Tournament Final|| Eindhoven, Netherlands || KO || 1 ||
|-
! style=background:white colspan=9 |
|-
|- bgcolor="#CCFFCC"
| 2015-05-16 || Win ||align=left| Boubaker El Bakouri  || A1WCC -86 kg 8 Men Tournament Semi Final || Eindhoven, Netherlands || Decision || 3 ||3:00
|-
|- bgcolor="#CCFFCC"
| 2015-05-16 || Win ||align=left| Xheyal Ehmedov || A1WCC -86 kg 8 Men Tournament Quarter Final|| Eindhoven, Netherlands || Decision || 3 ||3:00
|-
|-  bgcolor="#fbb" 
| 2015-04-19 || Loss ||align=left| Khalid El Bakouri || The Best of all Elements || Almere, Netherlands || Decision || 3  ||3:00
|-
|-  bgcolor="FFBBBB" 
| 2015-04-12 || Loss ||align=left| Hicham El Gaoui || World Fighting League, Final || Hoofddorp || Decision || 3  ||3:00
|-
! style="background:white" colspan=9 | 
|-
|-  bgcolor="CCFFCC" 
| 2015-04-12 || Win ||align=left| Clyde Brunswijk || World Fighting League, Semi Finals || Hoofddorp || Decision || 3  ||3:00
|-
|-  bgcolor="CCFFCC" 
| 2014-11-25 || Win ||align=left| Henry Brinkman || Fight Night IJmuiden || IJmuiden || KO ||  ||
|-
|-  bgcolor="#FFBBBB"
| 2014-10-25 || Loss ||align=left| Dawid Kasperski || SUPERKOMBAT World Grand Prix 2014 Final Elimination, Quarter Finals || Geneva, Switzerland || Decision (majority) || 3  ||3:00
|-
|-  bgcolor="CCFFCC" 
| 2014-06-08 || Win ||align=left| Samir Boukhidous || Fight Fans 10 || Amsterdam || Decision (unanimous) || 3 ||3:00
|- 
|-  bgcolor="CCFFCC" 
| 2014-06-06 || Win ||align=left| Denis Marjanović || FFC13: Jurković vs. Tavares || Zadar, Croatia || Decision (unanimous) || 3 ||3:00
|-  bgcolor="CCFFCC" 
| 2014-04-12 || Win ||align=left| Uroš Bogojević || SUPERKOMBAT World Grand Prix I 2014, Reserve Fight || Reșița, Romania || Decision (unanimous) || 3||3:00
|-  bgcolor="FFBBBB"
| 2014-03-22 || Loss ||align=left| Igor Lyapin || KOK World GP 2014, Quarter Finals || Chișinău, Moldova || Decision (split) || 3 ||3:00
|-  bgcolor="CCFFCC"
| 2014-02-23 || Win ||align=left| Iwan Pang || Haarlem Fight Night V || Haarlem || TKO || 3||
|-  bgcolor="CCFFCC"
| 2013-12-14 || Win ||align=left| Constantin Țuțu || KOK World Series - Eagles 12 || Chișinău, Moldova || KO (punches) || 1  ||
|-  bgcolor="#CCFFCC"
| 2013-12-01 || Win ||align=left| Sem Braan || Fight Fans 7 || Amsterdam || Decision || 3  ||3:00
|-  bgcolor="CCFFCC"
| 2013-11-15 || Win ||align=left| Miran Fabjan || FFC09: McSweeney vs. Traunmuller || Ljubljana, Slovenia || KO (left hook) || 2  ||
|-  bgcolor="CCFFCC"
| 2013-08-30 || Win ||align=left| Ciprian Șchiopu || SUPERKOMBAT New Heroes 5 || Târgoviște, Romania || Decision (unanimous)|| 3  ||3:00
|-  bgcolor="CCFFCC"
| 2013-06-14 || Win ||align=left| Igor Emkić || FFC06: Jurković vs. Poturak || Poreč, Croatia || KO (right cross) || 1 ||
|-  bgcolor="CCFFCC"
| 2013-05-11 || Win ||align=left| Martin Reemeijer || Mejiro Gym Gala || Zaandam, Netherlands || Decision (unanimous) || 3 ||3:00
|-  bgcolor="#FFBBBB"
| 2013-04-14 || Loss ||align=left| Toni Milanović || FFC03: Jurković vs. Cătinaș || Split, Croatia || Decision (unanimous) || 3  ||3:00
|-  bgcolor="#CCFFCC"
| 2013-03-24 || Win ||align=left| Ronnie Roomeijer || Haarlem Fight Night IV || Haarlem || Decision || 3 ||3:00
|-
! style=background:white colspan=9 |
|-
|-  bgcolor="CCFFCC"
| 2012-09-01 || Win ||align=left| Geronimo de Groot || Fight For Victory || Egmond aan Zee, Netherlands || KO || ||
|-  bgcolor="#c5d2ea"
| 2011-10-16 || Draw ||align=left| Tom Van Duivenvoorde || Top Team Gala|| Beverwijk, Netherlands || Decision (draw) || 3 ||3:00
|-
| colspan=9 | Legend:

See also 
List of male kickboxers

References

External links

1992 births
Living people
Moroccan male kickboxers
Cruiserweight kickboxers
Dutch male kickboxers
SUPERKOMBAT kickboxers
ONE Championship kickboxers
Glory kickboxers